Starke Zeiten is a 1988 West German comedy film directed by , Rolf Olsen, Otto Retzer, Sigi Rothemund and Helmut Fischer. The film has been produced by Karl Spiehs and Luggi Waldleitner.

Cast

References

External links
 

1988 films
1988 comedy films
German comedy films
West German films
1980s German-language films
German anthology films
Films directed by Sigi Rothemund
1980s German films